Jacqueline Díaz (born 15 June 1964) is a Chilean table tennis player. She competed in the women's singles event at the 1988 Summer Olympics.

References

External links
 

1964 births
Living people
Chilean female table tennis players
Olympic table tennis players of Chile
Table tennis players at the 1988 Summer Olympics
People from Rancagua
Pan American Games bronze medalists for Chile
Medalists at the 1991 Pan American Games
Pan American Games medalists in table tennis
Table tennis players at the 1991 Pan American Games
20th-century Chilean women